Emil Vasilyevich Tsatskin (born 3 June 1975) is a former Russian professional footballer.

Club career
He made his professional debut in the Russian Second Division in 1992 for FC Rostselmash-d Rostov-on-Don.

Honours
 Russian Premier League bronze: 1996.

References

1975 births
Footballers from Saint Petersburg
Living people
Russian footballers
Association football forwards
Russian Premier League players
Russian expatriate footballers
Expatriate footballers in Kazakhstan
FC Rotor Volgograd players
FC Rostov players
FC Dynamo Stavropol players
FC Kuban Krasnodar players
FC Luch Vladivostok players
FC Metallurg Lipetsk players
FC Volgar Astrakhan players
Russian expatriate sportspeople in Kazakhstan
FC Nika Krasny Sulin players
FC Taganrog players
FC Mashuk-KMV Pyatigorsk players